Novoli is a town and comune in the Italian province of Lecce in the Apulia region of south-east Italy.

Bounding communes
Arnesano
Campi Salentina
Carmiano
Lecce
Trepuzzi
Veglie

Population History

The population grew until the 1951 census, after the increasing trend, the population fell slowly mainly by emigration to other parts of Italy.

External links
Official site

References

Cities and towns in Apulia
Localities of Salento